The 2010–11 Pacific-10 Conference men's basketball season began with practices on October 18, 2010 and ended with the 2011 Pacific-10 Conference men's basketball tournament from March 9–11, 2011 at the Staples Center in Los Angeles. The regular season began on the weekend of November 12, with the conference schedule starting on December 30. The conference dedicated the season to legendary UCLA coach John Wooden, who died in June 2010 at age 99.

The Washington Huskies defeated the regular season champions Arizona Wildcats 77–75 in overtime to capture the tournament championship. Four Pac-10 teams were selected to participate in the NCAA tournament: Arizona, Washington, UCLA and USC.

This was the final season for the Pac-10 under that name. In July 2011, two schools joined the conference, at which time its name officially changed to Pac-12 Conference. Colorado arrived from the Big 12 and Utah entered from the Mountain West.

Pre-season

 Pre-season media day was held on October 28, 2010 at L.A. Live's Nokia Theatre in downtown Los Angeles. 
Dana Altman was named the head coach of the Oregon Ducks.
 2010–11 PAC-10 Men's Basketball Media Poll:
Rank, School (first-place votes), Points  
1.  Washington (33)  348  
2.  Arizona (1)  296  
3.  UCLA (1)  281  
4.  Arizona State  215  
5.  Washington State  191  
6.  USC  178  
7.  California  151  
8.  Oregon State 120  
9.  Stanford  98  
10.  Oregon  47

Rankings

 November 8, 2010 – Washington #17 (Coaches)
 November 15, 2010 – Washington #17 (AP), #15 (Coaches) 
 November 22, 2010 – Washington #13 (AP), #11 (Coaches) 
 November 29, 2010 – Washington #23 (AP), #22 (Coaches) 
 December 6, 2010 – Washington #21 (AP), #22 (Coaches)
 January 3, 2011 – Washington #23 (AP)
 January 10, 2011 – Washington #17 (AP), #18 (Coaches)

Non-Conference games
 November 24, 2010 – UCLA lost to No. 7 Villanova at the semifinals of the NIT Season Tip-Off.
 December 18, 2010 – UCLA upset No. 16 (AP) BYU 86–79 at the John R. Wooden Classic.

Conference games
 December 29 – First conference games.

Conference tournament

 March 9–11, 2011 – Pac-10 Conference Basketball Tournament, Staples Center, Los Angeles, California.

Head coaches

Sean Miller, Arizona
Herb Sendek, Arizona State
Mike Montgomery, California
Dana Altman, Oregon
Craig Robinson, Oregon State
Johnny Dawkins, Stanford
Ben Howland, UCLA
Kevin O'Neill, USC
Lorenzo Romar, Washington
Ken Bone, Washington State

Post season

NCAA tournament
 March 15, 2011 – Tournament begins.
 April 4, 2011 – National Championship game.
 March 13, 2011 – Four Pac-10 teams were selected: Arizona (West Region), Washington (East Region), UCLA (Southeast Region) and USC (Southwest Region).
 March 16, 2011 – USC ended its tournament hopes when they were defeated in the first round to VCU.
 March 17, 2011 – UCLA defeated Michigan State to advance to the third round to face Florida on Saturday, March 19, 2011.
 March 19, 2011 – UCLA was defeated by Florida 65–73 and ended its season.  
 March 20, 2011  – Arizona defeated Texas 70–69 to advance to the Sweet Sixteen and Washington was defeated by North Carolina 83–86 to end the season.
 March 24, 2011  – Arizona defeated 1-seed Duke 93–77 in the Sweet Sixteen to advance to the Elite 8.
 March 26, 2011 – Arizona was defeated by UConn 65–63 in the Elite 8.

NIT
 March 13, 2011 – Two Pac-10 teams were selected to play in the NIT: California (Colorado bracket), Washington State (Boston College bracket).

CBI

Highlights and notes
 November 12, 2010 – UCLA and Oregon kicked off the season with wins over San Diego State and North Dakota State respectively.
 February 25, 2011 – California was placed on two years probation for impermissible recruiting phone calls.
 February 26, 2011 – UCLA defeated Arizona in the final men's basketball game in Pauley Pavilion before the building goes into renovation for a year. The late Coach John Wooden's great-grandson Tyler Trapani scored the last two points for the Bruins.

Awards and honors
 The Pac-10 Coach of the Year Award in both men’s and women’s basketball is now known as the John Wooden Coach of the Year Award.

Scholar-Athlete of the Year

Player-of-the-Week

 Nov. 22 – Reeves Nelson, UCLA
 Dec. 6 – Derrick Williams, ARIZ
 Dec. 20 – Reeves Nelson, UCLA
 Jan. 3 – Matthew Bryan-Amaning, WASH
 Jan. 17 – Derrick Williams, ARIZ
 Jan. 31 – Lamont Jones, ARIZ
 Feb. 14 – Isaiah Thomas, WASH
 Feb. 28 – Nikola Vucevic, USC
 Nov. 29 – Klay Thompson, WSU
 Dec. 13 – Klay Thompson, WSU
 Dec. 27 – Jio Fontan, USC
 Jan. 10 – Isaiah Thomas, WASH
 Jan. 24 – Isaiah Thomas, WASH
 Feb. 7 – Joevan Catron, ORE
 Feb. 21 – Derrick Williams, ARIZ
 Mar. 7 – Ty Abbott, ASU

All-Americans

All-Pac-10 teams
Voting was by conference coaches:
Player of The Year: Derrick Williams, Arizona
Freshman of The Year: Allen Crabbe, California
Defensive Player of The Year: Marcus Simmons, USC
Most Improved Player of The Year: Matthew Bryan-Amaning, Washington
John R. Wooden Coach of the Year: Sean Miller, Arizona

FIRST TEAM:

All-Academic

First Team:

Second Team:

USBWA All-District team

References